Brokind is a locality situated in Linköping Municipality, Östergötland County, Sweden with 502 inhabitants in 2010.

Using bus it takes about 40 minutes to get to Linköping and by car approximately 20–25 minutes. Brokind is connected to Linköping city in the north and to the town Kisa in the south through Riksväg 34. (Approx: Kingdom/Realm road 34.)
In Brokind there are among other things a castle, food store, daycare center, soccer fields, tennis courts, lit jogging/skiing track, swimming facilities,  and a school that covers grade 1–6 in the Swedish school system.

The inhabitants of Brokind are generally upper middle class and above. In terms of buildings, the vast majority is single family detached homes or larger mansion-like structures along the lake although there also exists a few condominiums.

In recent years, the community went together and saved the local grocery store from financial bankruptcy.
Brokind is also since 1709 home to the Falkenberg family who carry the title Count.

References 

Populated places in Östergötland County
Populated places in Linköping Municipality